A. Frank Glahn (1865–1941), was a German mysticist, Germanic revivalist and most notably a pendulum dowser. He was used by the German military in the Third Reich, not necessarily willingly.

Glahn was mentioned greatly in the book Reveal the Power of the Pendulum by Karl Spiesberger.

In 1920 A. Frank-Glahn's "Das Deutsche Tarot Buch" was published by Uranus Verlag, accompanied by a deck of cards "Deutsches Original Tarot", an Egyptian style deck, but unique. Glahn's book and cards became a German tarot bible, which survived up in the 1980s, published by Hermann Bauer Verlag. (K.Frank Jensen)

Written works
Das Deutsche Tarotbuch Die Lehre von Weissagung und ...
Natürliche Kräfte und Strahlungen Pendellehre
Erklärung und systematische Deutung des Geburtshoroskopes:
Die Kardinalauslösungen der Planeten
Die Arbeit mit dem Erdhoroskop
Die Handhabung der Spiegelpunkte
Die Berücksichtigung der 36 Häuserdekanate
Die Verwendung der Halbdistanzpunkte
Glahns Rhythmenlehre mit Rhythmen von 8 1/3, 6, 7 oder 25 Jahren pro Haus.
Der Glahnsche Lebenskreis
Das Deutsche Tarotbuch, 1979, Bauer-Verlag, Freiburg
Das Mutterschaftsmysterium enthüllt, 1930, Uranus-Verlag, Memmingen
Die Begriffene Astrologie, 1933, Uranus-Verlag Memmingen
Erklärung und systematische Deutung des Geburtshoroskops, 1924, Uranus-Verlag Max Duphorn, Bad Oldesloe
Jedermanns Astrologie für das deutsche Volk, 1935, Uranus-Verlag Memmingen

Glahn also wrote many articles

See also
Nazi occultism
Pendulum
Dowsing
Karl Spiesberger

Notes

External links
The Life of Kummer from the Odinist Library

1865 births
1941 deaths
German astrologers
19th-century astrologers
20th-century astrologers
Occultism in Nazism
German occultists
Dowsing
German modern pagans
Adherents of Germanic neopaganism